Uranium-233 (233U or U-233) is a fissile isotope of uranium that is bred from thorium-232 as part of the thorium fuel cycle. Uranium-233 was investigated for use in nuclear weapons and as a reactor fuel. It has been used successfully in experimental nuclear reactors and has been proposed for much wider use as a nuclear fuel. It has a half-life of 160,000 years.

Uranium-233 is produced by the neutron irradiation of thorium-232. When thorium-232 absorbs a neutron, it becomes thorium-233, which has a half-life of only 22 minutes. Thorium-233 decays into protactinium-233 through beta decay. Protactinium-233 has a half-life of 27 days and beta decays into uranium-233; some proposed molten salt reactor designs attempt to physically isolate the protactinium from further neutron capture before beta decay can occur, to maintain the neutron economy (if it misses the 233U window, the next fissile target is 235U, meaning a total of 4 neutrons needed to trigger fission).

233U usually fissions on neutron absorption, but sometimes retains the neutron, becoming uranium-234. The capture-to-fission ratio of uranium-233 is smaller than those of the other two major fissile fuels, uranium-235 and plutonium-239.

Fissile material

In 1946, the public first became informed of uranium-233 bred from thorium as "a third available source of nuclear energy and atom bombs" (in addition to uranium-235 and plutonium-239), following a United Nations report and a speech by Glenn T. Seaborg.

The United States produced, over the course of the Cold War, approximately 2 metric tons of uranium-233, in varying levels of chemical and isotopic purity. These were produced at the Hanford Site and Savannah River Site in reactors that were designed for the production of plutonium-239.

Nuclear fuel
Uranium-233 has been used as a fuel in several different reactor types, and is proposed as a fuel for several new designs (see thorium fuel cycle), all of which breed it from thorium. Uranium-233 can be bred in either fast reactors or thermal reactors, unlike the uranium-238-based fuel cycles which require the superior neutron economy of a fast reactor in order to breed plutonium, that is, to produce more fissile material than is consumed.

The long-term strategy of the nuclear power program of India, which has substantial thorium reserves, is to move to a nuclear program breeding uranium-233 from thorium feedstock.

Energy released 
The fission of one atom of uranium-233 generates 197.9 MeV = 3.171·10−11 J  (i.e. 19.09 TJ/mol = 81.95 TJ/kg).

Weapon material

As a potential weapon material, pure uranium-233 is more similar to plutonium-239 than uranium-235 in terms of source (bred vs natural), half-life and critical mass (both 4–5 kg in beryllium-reflected sphere).

In 1994, the US government declassified a 1966 memo that states that uranium-233 has been shown to be highly satisfactory as a weapons material, though it is only superior to plutonium in rare circumstances. It was claimed that if the existing weapons were based on uranium-233 instead of plutonium-239, Livermore would not be interested in switching to plutonium.

The co-presence of uranium-232 can complicate the manufacture and use of uranium-233, though the Livermore memo indicates a likelihood that this complication can be worked around.

While it is thus possible to use uranium-233 as the fissile material of a nuclear weapon, speculation aside, there is scant publicly available information on this isotope actually having been weaponized:
 The United States detonated an experimental device in the 1955 Operation Teapot "MET" test which used a plutonium/233U composite pit; its design was based on the plutonium/235U pit from the TX-7E, a prototype Mark 7 nuclear bomb design used in the 1951 Operation Buster-Jangle "Easy" test. Although not an outright fizzle, MET's actual yield of 22 kilotons was sufficiently below the predicted 33 kt that the information gathered was of limited value.
 The Soviet Union detonated its first hydrogen bomb the same year, the RDS-37, which contained a fissile core of 235U and 233U.
 In 1998, as part of its Pokhran-II tests, India detonated an experimental 233U device of low-yield (0.2 kt) called Shakti V.

The B Reactor and others at the Hanford Site optimized for the production of weapons-grade material have been used to manufacture 233U.

Overall the United States is thought to have produced two tons of 233U, of various levels of purity, some with 232U impurity content as low as 6 ppm.

232U impurity
Production of 233U (through the irradiation of thorium-232) invariably produces small amounts of uranium-232 as an impurity, because of parasitic (n,2n) reactions on uranium-233 itself, or on protactinium-233, or on thorium-232:
232Th (n,γ) → 233Th (β−) → 233Pa (β−) → 233U (n,2n) → 232U
232Th (n,γ) → 233Th (β−) → 233Pa (n,2n) → 232Pa (β−)→ 232U
232Th (n,2n) → 231Th (β−) → 231Pa (n,γ) → 232Pa (β−) → 232U

Another channel involves neutron capture reaction on small amounts of thorium-230, which is a tiny fraction of natural thorium present due to the decay of uranium-238:
230Th (n,γ) → 231Th (β−) → 231Pa (n,γ) → 232Pa (β−) → 232U

The decay chain of 232U quickly yields strong gamma radiation emitters. Thallium-208 is the strongest of these, at 2.6 MeV:
 232U (α, 68.9 y)
 228Th (α, 1.9 y)
 224Ra (α, 5.44 MeV, 3.6 d, with a γ of 0.24 MeV)
 220Rn (α, 6.29 MeV, 56 s, with a γ of 0.54 MeV)
 216Po (α, 0.15 s)
 212Pb (β−, 10.64 h)
 212Bi (α, 61 min, 0.78 MeV)
 208Tl (β−, 1.8 MeV, 3 min, with a γ of 2.6 MeV)
 208Pb (stable)
This makes manual handling in a glove box with only light shielding (as commonly done with plutonium) too hazardous, (except possibly in a short period immediately following chemical separation of the uranium from its decay products) and instead requiring complex remote manipulation for fuel fabrication.

The hazards are significant even at 5 parts per million. Implosion nuclear weapons require 232U levels below 50 ppm (above which the 233U is considered "low grade"; cf. "Standard weapon grade plutonium requires a 240Pu content of no more than 6.5%." which is 65,000 ppm, and the analogous 238Pu was produced in levels of 0.5% (5,000 ppm) or less). Gun-type fission weapons additionally need low levels (1 ppm range) of light impurities, to keep the neutron generation low.

The production of "clean" 233U, low in 232U, requires a few factors: 1) obtaining a relatively pure 232Th source, low in 230Th (which also transmutes to 232U), 2) moderating the incident neutrons to have an energy not higher that 6 MeV (too-high energy neutrons cause the 232Th (n,2n) → 231Th reaction) and 3) removing the thorium sample from neutron flux before the 233U concentration builds up to a too high level, in order to avoid fissioning the 233U itself (which would produce energetic neutrons).

The Molten-Salt Reactor Experiment (MSRE) used 233U, bred in light water reactors such as Indian Point Energy Center, that was about 220 ppm 232U.

Further information 
Thorium, from which 233U is bred, is roughly three to four times more abundant in the earth's crust than uranium.
The decay chain of 233U itself is part of the neptunium series, the decay chain of its grandparent 237Np.

Uses for uranium-233 include the production of the medical isotopes actinium-225 and bismuth-213 which are among its daughters, low-mass nuclear reactors for space travel applications, use as an isotopic tracer, nuclear weapons research, and reactor fuel research including the thorium fuel cycle.

The radioisotope bismuth-213 is a decay product of uranium-233; it has promise for the treatment of certain types of cancer, including acute myeloid leukemia and cancers of the pancreas, kidneys and other organs.

See also
 Breeder reactor
 Liquid fluoride thorium reactor

Notes 

Actinides
Isotopes of uranium
Fissile materials
Special nuclear materials